Macropus pan is a species of marsupial that existed during the Pliocene in Australia, known only from fossils located at several sites across Australia. The species is recognised as allied to the modern grey kangaroos, the western Macropus fuliginosus and eastern Macropus giganteus, in a clade initially named as subgenus Macropus (Macropus) Dawson & Flannery.
The first description was provided by Charles W. De Vis in 1895, emerging from the author's examination of fossil material held at the Queensland Museum. Fossil specimens of Quanbun local fauna, named for a site in Western Australia, were also identified as this species. The origin of the type specimen was not recorded, although based on comparisons to material with a known provenance it is assumed to have excavated at Chinchilla, Queensland.
A larger macropod than any modern species, the standing height was estimated to be over two metres.

References

Species described in 1895
Macropods